Andy Pereira (born 31 August 1989 in Ciudad de la Habana) is a Cuban table tennis player. He competed at the 2012 Summer Olympics in the Men's singles, but was defeated in the first round.

Career
Pereira participated in the  2006 Central American and Caribbean Games held in Cartagena, Colombia, winning the gold medal in doubles and team competition.

References

External links
 
 
 

1989 births
Living people
Cuban male table tennis players
Olympic table tennis players of Cuba
Table tennis players at the 2012 Summer Olympics
Table tennis players at the 2016 Summer Olympics
Pan American Games medalists in table tennis
Pan American Games bronze medalists for Cuba
Central American and Caribbean Games gold medalists for Cuba
Central American and Caribbean Games silver medalists for Cuba
Competitors at the 2006 Central American and Caribbean Games
Competitors at the 2014 Central American and Caribbean Games
Table tennis players at the 2011 Pan American Games
Table tennis players at the 2015 Pan American Games
Table tennis players at the 2019 Pan American Games
Central American and Caribbean Games medalists in table tennis
Medalists at the 2011 Pan American Games
20th-century Cuban people
21st-century Cuban people